National Highway 65 (NH 65), (previously National Highway 9), is a National Highway in India. It runs along the states of Maharashtra, Karnataka, Telangana and Andhra Pradesh. It starts at Pune and ends at Machilipatnam. Major cities on this route are Pune, Solapur, Hyderabad, Suryapet, Vijayawada and Machilipatnam. The section between Hyderabad and Vijayawada, is known as Vijayawada–Hyderabad Expressway and is a major expressway.

The highway runs through the beautiful scenario of regions like Pune, Solapur, Hyderabad, Suryapet and more. The four lane wide highway drives swiftly through the villages of Maharashtra, Karnataka, Telangana and Andra Pradesh with best road conditions and minimum toll collection. For less traffic it takes bypass at many major cities like Indapur , Solapur, Hyderabad, Suryapet.The highway is in very poor conditions between Solapur until Maharashtra border with some stretches lacking any semblance of a road let alone a highway making it extremely prone to accidents.

Route 
The NH 65 passes through below cities and towns, in the order of travel from west to east:
Maharashtra (349.20 km)
 Pune
 Hadapsar (Suburb of Pune)
 Loni Kalbhor
 Bhigwan
 Indapur
 Mohol
 Solapur
 Naldurg
 Yenegur
 Omerga
Karnataka (75.61 km)
 Humnabad
 Mannaekhalli
Telangana (276.80 km)
 Zahirabad
 Sangareddy
 Hyderabad
 Choutuppal
 Chityal
 Narketpally
 Nakrekal
 Suryapet
 Munagala
 Kodad
Andhra Pradesh (150.05 km)
 Nandigama 
Kanchikacherla
 Vijayawada
 Pamarru
 Machilipatnam

See also 
 List of National Highways in India
 List of National Highways in India by state
 National Highways Development Project

References 

National highways in India
National Highways in Maharashtra
National Highways in Karnataka
National Highways in Telangana
National Highways in Andhra Pradesh